Dorian Aryeh Feigenbaum (born May 19, 1887 in Lemberg, Austria-Hungary; died in 1937) was an Austrian psychoanalyst and the co-founder and editor-in-chief of the academic journal The Psychoanalytic Quarterly.

He was graduated in medicine from the University of Vienna in 1914 and studied at the German Institute for Psychiatric Research in Munich, under the pioneering psychiatrist Emil Kraepelin.

Feigenbaum served as the director of Esrath Nashim (The Hospital for the Mental Diseases) in Jerusalem and as psychiatric consultant to the Government of Palestine until he was fired by the hospital board in 1924.

References

1887 births
1937 deaths
20th-century Austrian Jews
People in health professions from Lviv
Psychoanalysts
University of Vienna alumni